Frank Lee Williams  (February 13, 1958 – January 9, 2009) was a major league baseball player from 1984 through 1989.

Williams and his twin brother, of Tseshaht First Nation heritage, were placed for adoption at birth, and after some years in foster homes were raised in suburban Kirkland, Washington by Boeing engineer Dick McCullough. Williams attended Shoreline Community College in Seattle, then Lewis-Clark State College in Idaho, where he attracted the attention of scouts (and engaged in amateur tough man boxing in the offseason).

Williams was drafted by the San Francisco Giants in the 11th round of the 1979 amateur draft, and, after pitching for Great Falls, Fresno, Shreveport, and Phoenix, made his major league debut in 1984. A middle reliever, he pitched a shutout in his rookie season but started no other games and was credited with only eight saves over his six-season, 333-game career.

His best season was 1986, when he had a 1.20 earned run average, and, with 34 singles and one double given up in 52.1 innings, a defensive isolated power percentage (slugging percentage allowed minus batting average allowed, a measure of extra bases allowed on hits) of .006 – as of 2014, the lowest such percentage of anyone pitching 50 or more innings in records going back to 1957. He was traded in the offseason to the Cincinnati Reds and finished with the Detroit Tigers in 1989. He created the “slurve”, a slow side arm curve ball. Frank was known for his side arm and fast pitch.

After baseball, Williams suffered various misfortunes including a serious car accident, the breakup of his marriage, and the death of his twin brother. He struggled with alcoholism, and eventually became homeless. He died in Victoria, British Columbia, in January 2009 after suffering a heart attack and complications from pneumonia.  He is remembered by a son, Tyler Lee Williams, and a daughter, Lyndsay Kae Williams, both of Kendrick, Idaho.

References

External links
, or Retrosheet, or Pura Pelota

1958 births
2009 deaths
Baseball players from Seattle
Cincinnati Reds players
Detroit Tigers players
Fresno Giants players
Great Falls Giants players
Lewis–Clark State Warriors baseball players
Major League Baseball pitchers
Nashville Sounds players
Phoenix Firebirds players
Phoenix Giants players
San Francisco Giants players
Shreveport Captains players
Tigres de Aragua players
American expatriate baseball players in Venezuela